Thickhead  may refer to:

 Idiot
 Pachycephala, a genus of birds commonly known as whistlers
 Crassocephalum, a genus of plants

See also
 
 
 Blockhead (disambiguation)
 Thick (disambiguation)
 Head (disambiguation)